Joseph A. Creaghan (July 15, 1883 – April 15, 1966) was an American film actor. He appeared in more than 300 films between 1916 and 1965, and notably played Ulysses S. Grant nine times between 1939 and 1958, most memorably in Union Pacific and They Died with Their Boots On.

Early life
Born in Baltimore, Maryland. he was the son of Mr. and Mrs. Mathew Crehan. He attended Calvert Hall College and Kent College of Law but left the latter because of his stronger interest in drama. Early in his career, Crehan worked in light comedy. He was in his late 30s when he began doing character roles.

Career

Crehan's Broadway credits include Twentieth Century (1932), Lilly Turner (1932), Angels Don't Kiss (1932), Those We Love (1930), Sweet Land of Liberty (1929), Merry Andrew (1929), Ringside (1928), and Yosemite (1914). Crehan often played alongside Charles C. Wilson with whom he is sometimes confused.

In 1961, credited as "Joe Crehan", he appeared as "Thomas Boland" in the TV Western series Bat Masterson (S3E18 "The Prescott Campaign").

Death
On April 15, 1966, Crehan died of a stroke in Hollywood, California. He was buried on San Fernando Mission Cemetery in Mission Hills, Los Angeles.

Selected filmography

 Under Two Flags (1916) as Rake
 Stolen Heaven (1931) as Henry, Steve's Butler
 Secrets of a Secretary (1931) as Reporter (uncredited)
 Before Midnight (1933)
 Beyond the Law (1934)
 Among the Missing (1934)
 The Line-Up (1934)
 Traveling Saleslady (1935)
 Black Fury (1935)
 Go into Your Dance (1935)
 Oil for the Lamps of China (1935)
 Stranded (1935)
 Front Page Woman (1935)
 Page Miss Glory (1935)
 Bright Lights (1935)
 Special Agent (1935)
 The Case of the Lucky Legs (1935)
 The Payoff (1935)
 Frisco Kid (1935)
 Bengal Tiger (1936)
 Bullets or Ballots (1936) as Grand Jury Spokesman
 Earthworm Tractors (1936)
 Trailin' West (1936)
 Anthony Adverse (1936)
 China Clipper (1936)
 Cain and Mabel (1936) as Tom Reed's Boxing Manager
 Road Gang (1936) as Harry Shields
 Gold Diggers of 1937 (1936)
 Smart Blonde (1937)
 Talent Scout (1937)
 There Goes My Girl (1937)
 The Go Getter (1937)
 Kid Galahad (1937) as Brady
 This Is My Affair (1937)
 The Case of the Stuttering Bishop (1937) as Paul Drake
 Born Reckless (1937)
 The Wrong Road (1937)
 Here's Flash Casey (1938)
 Happy Landing (1938)
 Night Spot (1938)
 Alexander's Ragtime Band (1938)
 Four's a Crowd (1938)
 Billy the Kid Returns (1938)
 Girls on Probation (1938)
 Gang Bullets (1938)
 Star Reporter (1939)
Whispering Enemies (1939)
 Society Lawyer (1939)
 You Can't Get Away with Murder (1939) as Warden
 Union Pacific (1939)
 Tell No Tales (1939)
 Maisie (1939)
 Babes in Arms (1939)
 Hollywood Cavalcade (1939)
 The Roaring Twenties (1939) as Mr. Fletcher, the Foreman (uncredited)
 The Return of Doctor X (1939) as Editor
 Navy Secrets (1939)
 Music in My Heart (1940)
 Emergency Squad (1940)
 The Green Hornet (1940 serial)
 The House Across the Bay (1940)
 Gaucho Serenade (1940)
 Brother Orchid (1940) as Brother MacEwen
 Colorado (1940)
 City for Conquest (1940)
 South to Karanga (1940)
The Secret Seven (1940)
 Texas Rangers Ride Again (1940)
 Scattergood Baines (1941)
 Andy Hardy's Private Secretary (1941)
 Washington Melodrama (1941)
 Love Crazy (1941)
 Nevada City (1941)
 Manpower (1941)
 Nine Lives Are Not Enough (1941)
 Texas (1941)
 Three Girls About Town (1941)
 They Died with Their Boots On (1941) as Ulysses S. Grant (uncredited)
 The Courtship of Andy Hardy (1942)
 Junior Army (1942)
 Eyes of the Underworld (1942)
 Sealed Lips (1942)
 Gang Busters (1942, Serial)
 Murder in the Big House (1942)
 Larceny, Inc. (1942)
 Adventures of the Flying Cadets (1943, Serial)
 Mystery Broadcast (1943)
 She Has What It Takes (1943)
 Hands Across the Border (1944)
 Phantom Lady (1944)
 The Navy Way (1944)
 The Great Alaskan Mystery (1944, Serial)
 The Adventures of Mark Twain (1944) as Ulysses S. Grant and Riverboat Captain
 Black Magic (1944)
 Man Alive (1945)
 Dick Tracy (1945)
 The Shadow Returns (1946)
 Deadline at Dawn (1946)
 Strange Journey (1946)
 The Phantom Thief (1946)
 O.S.S. (1946)
 The Big Sleep (1946) as Medical Examiner (uncredited)
 Dangerous Money (1946)
 Dick Tracy vs. Cueball (1946)
 The Falcon's Adventure (1946)
 Behind the Mask (1946)
 Monsieur Verdoux (1947) as Broker (uncredited)
 Dick Tracy Meets Gruesome (1947)
 Louisiana (1947)
 Philo Vance's Gamble (1947)
 Adventures in Silverado (1948)
 The Hunted (1948)
 Night Time in Nevada (1948)
 The Countess of Monte Cristo (1948)
 Street Corner (1948)
 The Last Bandit (1949)
 Prejudice (1949) – as J. P. Baker
 Triple Trouble (1950)
 Pride of Maryland (1951) as Mr. Herndon
 Roadblock (1951) as Thompson (uncredited)
 The Family Secret (1951) as Bailiff (uncredited)
 Deadline - U.S.A. (1952) as City Editor (uncredited)
 Crazylegs (1953)
 Highway Dragnet (1954)
 Judgment at Nuremberg (1961) as Courtroom Spectator at verdict (uncredited)

References

External links

1883 births
1966 deaths
American male film actors
Male actors from Baltimore
20th-century American male actors
Burials at San Fernando Mission Cemetery